Viktor Ivanovich Sukhorukov PAR (born 10 November 1951) is a Russian actor. He has appeared in more than 50 films and television shows since 1974. He starred in Happy Days (1991), which was screened in the Un Certain Regard section at the 1992 Cannes Film Festival. Sukhorukov is most known for his role as Viktor Bagrov in the films  Brother and Brother 2.

Selected filmography

 Happy Days (1991)
 The Year of the Dog (1994)
 The Castle (1994)
 All My Lenins (1997)
 Brother (1997)
 Of Freaks and Men (1998)
 Brother 2 (2000)
 Antikiller (2002)
 Poor Poor Paul (2003)
 Goddess: How I fell in Love (2004)
 Graveyard Shift (2005)
 Dead Man's Bluff (2005)
 The Island (2006)
 Hamlet. XXI Century (2009)
 Silent Souls (2010)
 In the Style of Jazz (2010)
 Furtseva (12-part Russian TV series) (2011)
 Ivan Tsarevich and the Gray Wolf (2011)
 Orlean (2015)
 Paradise (2016)

See also 

Sergei Bodrov, Jr.
Darya Jurgens

References

External links

1951 births
Living people
Russian male film actors
People from Orekhovo-Zuyevo
20th-century Russian male actors
21st-century Russian male actors
Russian male voice actors
People's Artists of Russia
Honored Artists of the Russian Federation
Recipients of the Nika Award